In number theory, an n-smooth (or n-friable) number is an integer whose prime factors are all less than or equal to n. For example, a 7-smooth number is a number whose every prime factor is at most 7, so 49 = 72 and 15750 = 2 × 32 × 53 × 7 are both 7-smooth, while 11 and 702 = 2 × 33 × 13 are not 7-smooth. The term seems to have been coined by Leonard Adleman. Smooth numbers are especially important in cryptography, which relies on factorization of integers. The 2-smooth numbers are just the powers of 2, while 5-smooth numbers are known as regular numbers.

Definition
A positive integer is called B-smooth if none of its prime factors are greater than B. For example, 1,620 has prime factorization 22 × 34 × 5; therefore 1,620 is 5-smooth because none of its prime factors are greater than 5. This definition includes numbers that lack some of the smaller prime factors; for example, both 10 and 12 are 5-smooth, even though they miss out the prime factors 3 and 5, respectively. All 5-smooth numbers are of the form 2a × 3b × 5c, where a, b and c are non-negative integers.

The 3-smooth numbers have also been called "harmonic numbers", although that name has other more widely used meanings.
5-smooth numbers are also called regular numbers or Hamming numbers; 7-smooth numbers are also called humble numbers, and sometimes called highly composite, although this conflicts with another meaning of highly composite numbers.

Here, note that B itself is not required to appear among the factors of a B-smooth number. If the largest prime factor of a number is p then the number is B-smooth for any B ≥ p. In many scenarios B is prime, but composite numbers are permitted as well. A number is B-smooth if and only if it is p-smooth, where p is the largest prime less than or equal to B.

Applications
An important practical application of smooth numbers is the fast Fourier transform (FFT) algorithms (such as the Cooley–Tukey FFT algorithm), which operates by recursively breaking down a problem of a given size n into problems the size of its factors. By using B-smooth numbers, one ensures that the base cases of this recursion are small primes, for which efficient algorithms exist. (Large prime sizes require less-efficient algorithms such as Bluestein's FFT algorithm.)

5-smooth or regular numbers play a special role in Babylonian mathematics. They are also important in music theory (see Limit (music)), and the problem of generating these numbers efficiently has been used as a test problem for functional programming.

Smooth numbers have a number of applications to cryptography. While most applications center around cryptanalysis (e.g. the fastest known integer factorization algorithms, for example: General number field sieve algorithm), the VSH hash function is another example of a constructive use of smoothness to obtain a provably secure design.

Distribution

Let  denote the number of y-smooth integers less than or equal to x (the de Bruijn function).

If the smoothness bound B is fixed and small, there is a good estimate for :

 

Otherwise, define the parameter u as u = log x / log y: that is, x = yu.  Then,

where  is the Dickman function.

For any k, almost all natural numbers will not be k-smooth.

Powersmooth numbers

Further, m is called B-powersmooth (or B-ultrafriable) if all prime powers  dividing m satisfy:

For example, 720 (24 × 32 × 51) is 5-smooth but not 5-powersmooth (because there are several prime powers greater than 5,  e.g.  and ). It is 16-powersmooth since its greatest prime factor power is 24 = 16. The number is also 17-powersmooth, 18-powersmooth, etc.

B-smooth and B-powersmooth numbers have applications in number theory, such as in Pollard's p − 1 algorithm and ECM. Such applications are often said to work with "smooth numbers," with no B specified; this means the numbers involved must be B-powersmooth, for some unspecified small number B. As B increases, the performance of the algorithm or method in question degrades rapidly. For example, the Pohlig–Hellman algorithm for computing discrete logarithms has a running time of O(B1/2)—for groups of B-smooth order.

Smooth over a set A

Note the set A does not have to be a set of prime factors, but it is typically a proper subset of the primes as seen in the factor base of Dixon's factorization method and the quadratic sieve. Likewise, it is what the general number field sieve uses to build its notion of smoothness, under the homomorphism .

See also
Highly composite number
Rough number
Round number
Størmer's theorem
Unusual number

Notes and references

Bibliography
 G. Tenenbaum, Introduction to analytic and probabilistic number theory, (AMS, 2015) 
 A. Granville, Smooth numbers: Computational number theory and beyond, Proc. of MSRI workshop, 2008

External links
 
The On-Line Encyclopedia of Integer Sequences (OEIS)
lists B-smooth numbers for small Bs:
 2-smooth numbers: A000079 (2i)
 3-smooth numbers: A003586 (2i3j)
 5-smooth numbers: A051037 (2i3j5k)
 7-smooth numbers: A002473 (2i3j5k7l)
 11-smooth numbers: A051038 (etc...)
 13-smooth numbers: A080197
 17-smooth numbers: A080681
 19-smooth numbers: A080682
 23-smooth numbers: A080683

Analytic number theory
Integer sequences